Ureibacillus is a genus of gram-negative bacteria within the largely gram-positive Bacillota. Ureibacilli are motile and form spherical endospores. The type species of the genus is Ureibacillus thermosphaericus.

History 
The genus Ureibacillus was split from the genus Bacillus in 2001 to encompass Bacillus thermosphaericus (now Ureibacillus thermosphaericus) as well as several newly discovered similar strains of bacteria.

In 2020, multiple Lysinibacillus species were transferred into Ureibacillus based on branching patterns in various phylogenetic trees constructed based on conserved genome sequences, indicating their phylogenetic relatedness. The family Caryophanaceae encompassed many branching anomalies such as this one, partially due to the reliance on 16S rRNA sequences as a method for classification, which is known to have low resolution power and give differing results depending on the algorithm used. 

Analysis of genome sequences from Ureibacillus species identified three conserved signature indels (CSIs) that are uniquely present in this genus in the following proteins: MFS transporter, EamA family transporter, and DNA internalization-related competence protein ComEC/Rec2. These CSIs provide a reliable molecular method for distinguishing Ureibacillus species from other genera within the family Caryophanaceae and all other bacteria.

References

External links 
 LPSN page on Ureibacillus

Bacillales
Bacteria genera